Trifurcula subnitidella is a moth of the family Nepticulidae. It is widespread in Europe southward to the northern border of the Sahara in Tunisia and eastward to the Crimea and Asia minor.

The wingspan is 4.2-5.8 mm for males and 4.4-5.4 mm for females. Larvae have been found in September and October and adults are on wing from May (March in Tunisia) to early September.

The larvae feed on Lotus corniculatus and possibly other Lotus species. They mine the bark of their host plant. The mine consists of a long gallery in the bark of the stem. The larva first mines down, then goes up the stem in a rather straight line, or partly encircling the stem, occasionally going down again in the last part of the mine. At first, the mine is narrow, reddish brown, with straight edges, but later becomes as wide as the stem, with irregular margins, becoming silvery white in fresh mines. The frass is brown and deposited in a central line. Pupation takes place outside of the mine.

External links
The Trifurcula Subnitidella Group (Lepidoptera: Nepticulidae): Taxonomy, Distribution and Biology
Fauna Europaea
 Swedish moths Image and Swedish text 
 Figures of genitalia

Nepticulidae
Moths of Europe
Moths of Africa
Moths of Asia
Moths described in 1843